Grabsteinland I is the seventh album of Untoten.

Track listing
"Wie kleine diese Welt... (Overtüre)"– 3:58
"Mit Den Augen Der Nacht"– 3:20
"Grabsteinland (Wach auf)"– 4:52
"Rabenlied (oder Die Legende von 300 Wölfen)"– 2:27
"Cynthia"– 4:31
"Du Hast mir ein Haus erbaut"– 3:11
"Alexanderplatz"– 4:46
"Siehst Du es denn nicht (ach du)"– 3:41
"NibelungenTreue"– 2:24
"Kristallwald"– 2:51
"Willst Du? (Remix)"-5:34
"Never"-3:46
"Land Im Nebel (reprise)"-1:50
"Land im Nebel (Outro)"-2:36

Info
 All tracks written and produced by David A. Line
 Male vocals by David A. Line
 Female vocals by Greta Csatlós

External links
 

2003 albums
Untoten albums